Hamlet Mkhitaryan may refer to:

 Hamlet Mkhitaryan (footballer, born 1962) or Hamlet Apetnakovich Mkhitaryan (1962–1996), deceased Soviet/Armenian footballer who played as a striker. Father of footballer Henrikh Mkhitaryan
 Hamlet Mkhitaryan (footballer, born 1973), or Hamlet Vladimirovich Mkhitaryan, Armenian footballer who plays as a midfielder

See also
Mkhitaryan